Musa Araz (born 17 January 1994) is a Swiss footballer who plays for Sion.

International career
Araz is of Turkish descent. He is a youth international for Switzerland.

Honours 
Konyaspor
Turkish Super Cup: 2017

References

1994 births
Living people
People from Fribourg
Swiss men's footballers
Switzerland youth international footballers
Swiss people of Turkish descent
FC Basel players
FC Le Mont players
FC Winterthur players
FC Lausanne-Sport players
Konyaspor footballers
Bursaspor footballers
Neuchâtel Xamax FCS players
FC Sion players
Swiss Super League players
Swiss Challenge League players
Süper Lig players
TFF First League players
Association football midfielders
Sportspeople from the canton of Fribourg